The Eberman Monoplane was an original Anzani-powered aircraft design by Gus Eberman built in 1930.

Design and development
The Eberman Monoplane was built in Geneva, Illinois.

The Eberman Monoplane was a high-wing conventional landing gear-equipped aircraft with an open cockpit. The wings used fir spars with steel lift struts. The fuselage was all wood. The ailerons were controlled with a push-pull tube. The tail surfaces were welded steel tubing with aircraft fabric covering.

Operational history
The aircraft flew for 105 minutes total before its first engine failure. A 1928 Anzani engine was installed as a replacement which subsequently failed after 12 hours.

Specifications (Eberman 1930 Monoplane)

References

Homebuilt aircraft